The index of physics articles is split into multiple pages due to its size.

To navigate by individual letter use the table of contents below.

Y

Y(4140)
Y-Δ transform
Y. P. Varshni
Yablonovite
Yadin Dudai
Yahya El Mashad
Yakir Aharonov
Yakov Borisovich Zel'dovich
Yakov Frenkel
Yakov Lvovich Alpert
Yamakawa Kenjirō
Yang Fujia
Yang–Baxter equation
Yang–Mills existence and mass gap
Yang–Mills theory
Yang–Mills–Higgs equations
Yarkovsky effect
Yash Pal
Yasha Rosenfeld
Yasushi Takahashi
Yaw-rate sensor
Yaw drive
Yb:LuVO4
Yehia El-Mashad
Yehuda (Leo) Levi
Yellowcake
Yerevan Physics Institute
Yevgeny Adamov
Yevgeny Konstantinovich Fyodorov
Yevgeny Zababakhin
Yevgeny Zavoisky
Yield curve (physics)
Yield surface
Yilmaz theory of gravitation
Yoel Rephaeli
Yoichiro Nambu
Yoji Totsuka
Yoseph Bar-Cohen
Yoseph Imry
Yoshiaki Arata
Yoshiki Kuramoto
Yoshio Nishina
Young's interference experiment
Young's modulus
Young Medal and Prize
Young stellar object
Young–Laplace equation
Yousef Sobouti
Yrast
Yttrium aluminium garnet
Yttrium barium copper oxide
Yttrium lithium fluoride
Yttrium orthovanadate
Yu Min (physicist)
Yuen-Ron Shen
Yukawa interaction
Yukawa potential
Yulii Borisovich Khariton
Yun Wang
Yuri Golfand
Yuri Nikolaevich Denisyuk
Yuri Orlov
Yuri Osipyan
Yuri Trutnev (scientist)
Yurii Shirokov
Yuriy Rumer
Yuval Ne'eman
Yves Fortier (geologist)
Yves Rocard
Yvonne Choquet-Bruhat

Indexes of physics articles